Wolfgang Biedron (born 11 June 1951) is a Swedish judoka. He competed in the men's half-lightweight event at the 1980 Summer Olympics.

References

1951 births
Living people
Swedish male judoka
Olympic judoka of Sweden
Judoka at the 1980 Summer Olympics
Sportspeople from the Upper Palatinate
People from Neumarkt (district)
20th-century Swedish people